Cost And Management Accountant (India) is a qualified accountant of Institute of Cost Accountants of India. The person clears the Institute conducted examination  with prescribed percentage and also completes the required theory and practical trainings conducted by the Institute before being eligible as a  registered member with it. As a qualified professional, he can perform the tasks enlisted by the Institute for organisations with manufacturing or service background to ensure proper Costing, accounting, auditing and taxation related controls to be followed by them in the running of their business and operations. These policies clears any ambiguities for the organisations in the maintenance of their books of accounts. The The Institute of Cost Accountants of India has 90000 Cost And Management Accountants.

History and objective 

A Cost And Management Accountant (India) is a person who has qualified the examinations and completed the required practical and theoretical sessions conducted by Institute of Cost Accountants of India, which was formed as body of registered cost accountants in 1959. The person is required have sound knowledge in the subject related to Cost Accounting, Accounting, Auditing, and various aspects of Direct and Indirect Taxation for companies engaged in manufacturing and service based operations. Currently there are 90000 Cost And Management Accountants registered with The Institute of Cost Accountants of India and 5,00,00 registered as students.

Education 

Following are the required educational qualifications for the three levels:

Foundation 

 An aspirant can enroll for Foundation Level of Cost And Management Accountant (India) after completion of 10th class from recognized Board or Institution.

 He can also enroll after passing out 1. from recognised board  exam held at Senior Secondary level as per 10+2 scheme 2.from Central Government recognised examination for senior secondary level 3. All India Council for Technical Education examination in commerce for National diploma 4. All India Council recognised exam for senior secondary levels organised by State Board of Technical Education 5. Exam conducted by National Council of Rural Higher Education for Diploma in Rural Service.

Intermediate 

 An aspirant can enroll for Intermediate Level of Cost And Management Accountant (India) after passing of 12th class(10+2) from recognized Board or Institution and foundation level exam conducted by Institute of Cost Accountants of India .

 Is a graduate from any recognised university or institution in any discipline other than fine arts.

 Passed out examination on Part 1 conducted for Foundation (entry-level) by CAT of Institute of Cost Accountants of India.

 Passed out examination on Part 1 along with Competency level Part 2 conducted for Foundation (entry-level) by CAT of Institute of Cost Accountants of India.

 Cleared foundation level examination from Institute of Company Secretaries of India or The Institute of Cost & Works Accountants of India (ICWA) after passing out 10+2 level examination.

Final 

 Passed out Intermediate level examination conducted by  Institute of Cost Accountants of India in addition to practical training for 15 months.

Responsibilities 

A Cost And Management Accountant in India performs following activities:

Financial Services 

  Consultation on tax related matters.

  Consultation on Project management.

  Valuation of Business

 Audit of stocks.

 Banks related due diligence and concurrent audits.

 Audit of Internal control and costing system in state, central and public sector undertakings.

 Customs Act, 1962 based special audits.

Management Consultancy services 

 Planning in Financial Management.

 Determining Financial policy.

 Management of Working capital.

 Capital and Revenue budgets.

 Management of Inventory.

 Storage and handling of materials.

 Selection and Recruitment of personnel.

 Planning incentive for executives.

 Financial Planning based advice.

 Wage incentive based planning.

Curriculum 

Following are the curriculum and eligibility for clearance of each of the stages:

Foundation Course 

Includes four subjects of 100 marks each and duration of exam being 3 hours each.

Paper 1: Management and Economics Fundamentals.

Paper 2: Accounting Fundamentals.

Paper 3: Laws and Ethics Fundamentals. 

Paper 4: Statistics and Business Mathematics Fundamentals

Qualifying Marks

Examination for Cost And Management Accountant Foundation Level are conducted each year in May and November.

An aspirant needs to get 40 percent minimum in each subject and an aggregate of 50 percent in all subjects, to qualify in the foundation examination.

Intermediate Examination 

The Intermediate Exam consists of 4 papers each in two groups carrying 100 marks each with prescribed time limit of 3 hours during exam.

GROUP 1

Paper 1: Accounting the Financials.

Paper 2: Ethics and Laws

Paper 3: Direct Tax Laws

Paper 4: Accounting on Cost

GROUP 2

Paper 5: Operation management

Paper 6: Financial management and Cost & management accounting.

Paper 7: Indirect taxation.

Paper 8: Audit and Company Accounts.

Marks needed to Qualify 

A candidate can either opt to attempt for single or both groups in examination, however he can aim for All India Rank in the examination only if he attends and clears both groups at a time and is able to secure marks at top 50 candidates level attending from country.

An aspirant needs to get 40 percent minimum in each subject and an aggregate of 50 percent in all subjects, to qualify in the Intermediate examination. If a candidate appears for examination for both groups and if he is able to secure minimum qualified marks in all subjects in either groups or both groups but fails to get aggregate in any  group than the same can be set off from the excess marks from other group. However if still the marks are unable to meet the aggregate criteria in required group, then he is considered as fail for the group he is unable to secure the aggregate and needs to attend again.

Exemption:1.In a exam, if a student gets 60 percent marks in any subjects but fails to clear that group, he will be exempted from appearing in that subject for 3 consecutive exams conducted subsequent to that exam. However, for the exempted subject the percentage of mark will be taken as 50 for the calculation of aggregate in that group.2.In a exam, if a student gets 60 percent marks in any subjects and gets 40 percent marks in that group, but fails to clear that group, he will be exempted from appearing in that subject for 3 consecutive exams conducted subsequent to that exams and will be allowed to carry forward that percentage of marks for future attempts.

Final Examination 

The Final exam in Cost And Management Accountant has 8 papers of 100 marks each, which are divided into four subjects in two groups. The exam duration for each subject is 3 hours.

GROUP 3

Paper 1: Compliance and Corporate Laws.

Paper 2: Financial and Strategic Management

Paper 3: Decision Making in Strategic Cost Management.

Paper 4: Taxation in International Laws and Direct Tax Laws.

GROUP 4

Paper 5: Reporting of Corporate Financials.

Paper 6: Laws and Practice in Indirect Taxation.

Paper 7: Management and Cost Audit.

Paper 8: Business Valuation and Strategic Performance Management.

Qualifying Marks

A candidate can either opt to attempt for single or both groups in examination, however he can aim for All India Rank in the examination only if he attends and clears both groups at a time and is able to secure marks at top 50 candidates level attending from country.

An aspirant needs to get 40 percent minimum in each subject and an aggregate of 50 percent in all subjects, to qualify in the Final examination. If a candidate appears for examination for both groups and if he is able to secure minimum qualified marks in all subjects in either groups or both groups but fails to get aggregate in any group than the same can be set off from the excess marks from other group. However if still the marks are unable to meet the aggregate criteria in required group, than he is considered as fail for the group he is unable to secure the aggregate and needs to attend again.

Exemption:1.In a exam, if a student gets 60 percent marks in any subjects but fails to clear that group, he will be exempted from appearing in that subject for 3 consecutive exams conducted subsequent to that exam. However, for the exempted subject the percentage of mark will be taken as 50 for the calculation of aggregate in that group.2.In a exam, if a student gets 60 percent marks in any subjects and gets 40 percent marks in that group, but fails to clear that group, he will be exempted from appearing in that subject for 3 consecutive exams conducted subsequent to that exams and will be allowed to carry forward that percentage of marks for future attempts.

Examination 

The Examination by Institute of Cost Accountants of India at Foundation, Intermediate and Final levels are conducted two times in a year in months of June and December.

Practical Training 

A student of Cost And Management Accountant (India) should complete 15 months of practical training with cost accountant who is in practice or cost accountants firm or with any Institute prescribed firm of cost accountants to be eligible for attending examination for final course. They can enroll for practical training anytime after registering for Intermediate level examination. To be a member of  Institute of Cost Accountants of India and start their own practice, they should complete 3 years of practical training.

Recognition 

Cost And Management Accountant (India) are eligible for courses to do Ph.D in universities based in India, National Eligibility Test (NET) conducted by UGC and the award of Fellowship in Junior Research or Assistant Professor as the degree holders of Chartered Accountancy (CA) course are considered equivalent to Post Graduates by the UGC.

Cost And Management Accountant (India) can also practice in United States.

Related Articles 

 Institute of Cost Accountants of India.

References

External links 
 Official Website

Accountants
Accounting qualifications
Indian accountants